The United States has experienced an increase in the number of people incarcerated that have an opioid addiction. It is estimated that there is around 7 million people incarcerated in the United States. Over half of them meet the Diagnostic and Statistical Manual for Mental Disorders criteria for drug abuse or dependence and only 20% receive treatment. To alleviate the problem, the Department of Corrections has implemented different treatment plans for those who are suffering with an opioid addiction.

Historical Approaches to Treatment 
In the 1980s, there was a movement to crack down on drug users and dealers by using harsher sentences. This created a rapid increase in the number of people in prison that were abusing drugs. The Department of Corrections implemented many prison-based drug treatment programs to help those with addiction, but the DOC was met with many opposers. There was a strong belief that "nothing works"  when it comes to trying to rehabilitate people in prison. The thought was that any treatment used to help with drug addiction would be a waste of resources and effort to help prisoners with an addiction, so the Department of Corrections focused more on retribution instead of rehabilitation. Those who were incarcerated with an addiction had to go through detox and withdrawal without special treatment and when they were released there was a high likelihood they would relapse and become addicted to drugs again. To help this problem, there were attempts made to establish drug treatment programs in prison even though many did not agree with them.

Cornerstone 
The Cornerstone program was created in 1976 to be a pre-release treatment program. The inmates apart of this treatment program lived in a residential unit on the grounds of a hospital instead of the prison itself. Prisoners had to be referred to this program by prison counselors in order to receive treatment. During treatment, the prisoners had to fallow a strict set of rules with serious consequences. Any violation of the major rules, such as no using drugs or no use of violence, was an automatic release from the program. Minor infractions were used to practice appropriate behavior and good behavior lead to incentives.

Stay'n Out 
Stay'n out was created to be a therapeutic community for incarcerated drug offenders. This program was established in 1977 for males and 1978 for females. The offenders in this program were housed in separate living facilities from the general population in the prison but they still interacted with the inmates during the rest of the day. A majority of the program staff was former addicts that had successful experiences in therapeutic communities. Stay'n Out used the same format as Cornerstone. There was a strict set of rules and regulations that the inmates had to follow in order to stay in the program. When the rules were broken, the inmate was released from the program and sent to live with the general population again.

Current Treatment for Opioid Addiction

Principles for Drug Treatment Programs 
To improve opioid treatment programs in the criminal justice setting, the National Institute on Drug Abuse created 13 principles to help shape programs. These principles provide guidelines for creating new treatment programs and are used to help increase the likelihood the treatment programs will succeed. The 13 principles are:

 Drug Addiction is a brain disease that affects behavior.
 Recovery from drug addiction requires effective treatment, followed by management of the problem over time.
 Treatment must last long enough to produce stable behavioral changes.
 Assessment is the first step in treatment.
 Tailoring services to fit the needs of the individual is an important part of effective drug abuse treatment for criminal justice populations.
 Drug use during treatment should be carefully monitored.
 Treatment should target factors that are associated with criminal behavior.
 Criminal justice supervision should incorporate treatment planning for drug abusing offenders, and treatment providers should be aware of correctional supervision requirements.
 Continuity of care is essential for drug abusers reentering the community.
 A balance of rewards and sanctions encourages pro-social behavior and treatment participation.
 Offenders with co-occurring drug abuse and mental health problems often require an integrated treatment approach.
 Medications are an important part of treatment for many drug abusing offenders.
 Treatment planning for drug abusing offenders who are living in or re-entering the community should include strategies to prevent and treat serious, chronic medical conditions, such as HIV/AIDS, hepatitis B and C, and tuberculosis.

The implementation of these principles have led to the creation of several treatment programs that are used today in the correctional system.

Providing Medication 
The treatment program that is implemented in the corrections system for helping those with opioid addiction is administering medications that help to decrease opioid use. There are to main groups of medications that are administered in prisons: maintenance/substitution medications and relapse prevention medications. Maintenance/substitution medications are any medications that are opioid agonists or partial agonists. This type of medications stimulate opioid receptors and lower cravings and reduce the risk of withdrawal. Relapse prevention medications are any that are receptor antagonists. The three most commonly used medications are burenorphine, methadone, and extended release naltxrone. Burenorphine and methadone are considered maintenance/substitution medications and naltxrone is a relapse prevention medication. These medications also help with reducing opioid-related overdose deaths, criminal activity, and infectious disease transmissions. However, using the medication alone is not effective. The medications work best when they are combined with behavioral counseling. This is known as medication-assisted treatment (MAT). Inmates who were treated through the medication-assisted treatment program are less likely to relapse after being released.

Effectiveness of Opioid Treatment in the Correctional System 
Opioid treatment in the correctional setting has created a vast improvement in the number of people with addiction in prison; however, there are areas that are still lacking. There has been a great deal of interest in helping those with opioid addiction in correctional facilities, but the treatment provided is not adequate. Only a small portion of the offenders have access to the treatment programs. Only 11% of inmates who needed treatment actually receive it. Not all prisons have the same programs, limiting those that can be helped. Treatment programs are also only for those who are incarcerated. Once a prisoner is released, treatment stops. This leads to many parolees relapsing a committing another crime.

References

Prisons in the United States